The LRTA 13000 class is a class of fourth-generation high-floor light rail vehicles (LRV) ordered by the Philippine Department of Transportation in 2017. The trains were constructed in 2019 and are now undergoing the  testing trials along the LRT Line 1. The first trainset was targeted to enter service by May 2022, but this was since delayed to the first quarter of 2023, while the overall deliveries of the trains are set to be completed in 2023.

It is the first LRV in the system with 5 digits in the body number due to the class fleet exceeding 99 units, in comparison to the older fleet.

Purchase
To prepare for the construction of the LRT Line 1 Cavite extension, new trains were needed to meet the growing demand. A bidding for the purchase of 120 light rail vehicles (30 four-car train sets) was conducted from October 2015 to February 2016, with Japanese companies only allowed to participate in the auction. Marubeni Corporation and Sumitomo Corporation expressed interest to participate in the auction. However, the first bidding failed due to no bids.

The second bidding was conducted in 2017. The bidders included Marubeni Corporation with Hyundai Rotem, and Mitsubishi Corporation with Construcciones y Auxiliar de Ferrocarriles (CAF). Mitsubishi and CAF was awarded the JPY 30 billion (PHP 14.1 billion) contract in November 2017, and the contract was signed by the Department of Transportation and Mitsubishi Corporation on December 1. Mitsubishi Corporation is the implementing contractor of the procurement project while Construcciones y Auxiliar de Ferrocarriles is the train manufacturer. These trains are expected to gradually replace the aging 1000 class which has been in use since the opening of the line in 1984 and has undergone three refurbishments.

The purchase of 120 light rail vehicles (30 four-car train sets) is funded by Japan's official development assistance.

Design
The LRV design is a 6-axle rigid body consisting of two articulated cars, like those of the 1100 and 1200 class trains.

Car body

The train car body is made of stainless steel. Each LRV has four sliding pocket-type doors per side. The trains will also feature air-conditioning, LED destination panels and LED lighting in the trains' interiors and exteriors. The trains also sport a livery of crimson and silver.

Interior
As opposed to the older rolling stock, the 13000 class includes hand straps aside from safety handrails installed above the train floor.

The trains are also the first in the Philippines to feature a specially-made wheelchair-compatible space or passenger with restricted mobility (PRM) areas, located closer to the driver's cab as compared to the 1100 class and 1200 class where it is located near the articulation. Unlike the 1200 class, there are also fewer side handrails in the middle sections of each vehicle. Longitudinal seating will be featured in the 13000 class.

Like the 1100 class and 1200 class, there are four pocket-type doors per side per car. For the driving cars, one door will be installed on the side of the driving cab.

Mechanical 
The bogies are of inside-frame type, similar to the 1000 class. Each LRV has three bogies consisting of two motorized bogies at the ends of the LRV and one trailer bogie under the articulation.

Semi-permanent couplers are present in the ends of each light rail vehicle except the driving cab section of the head car.

Traction and auxiliaries 
Like the second and third-generation trains, the IGBT–VVVF traction control system will be used. The traction motors consist of four 3-phase AC induction motors.

The auxiliaries consists of a static inverter, a low-power DC voltage supply, and batteries.

Signalling and control systems 
The trains are equipped with the automatic train protection (ATP) system. Alstom was awarded the signalling and communications contract for the south extension of the LRT Line 1 in 2016. The contractual scope included the upgrading of the signalling system and the installation of the Atlas 100 on-board signalling solution for 60 train sets across the existing three generations of trains and the 13000 class trains.

The trains are also equipped with a Train Control and Monitoring System (TCMS).

Formation 

Details of the car designations are listed below:
Mc  - head car
M - intermediate car

Operations
The first two sets (8 cars) were initially planned to be delivered in July 2020, however the delivery was delayed due to the COVID-19 pandemic.

On January 18, 2021, the first batch of deliveries, consisting of the first trainset (4 cars consisting of two articulated cars each) arrived at the Port of Manila. The new trains were unveiled to the public on January 26, 2021. The delivery of the trains are expected to be completed in June 2022, with at least one trainset arriving every month until the deliveries are completed.

The trains are currently undergoing  test runs along the LRT Line 1 since May 2022. Initially expected to enter in-service operations by the end of the month, the trains have not been in use due to water leaks found in twenty train sets or 80 cars in February 2023. The agency is now coordinating with the manufacturer for a comprehensive roof rectification plan to address these issues onsite, including those that are still in the factory awaiting delivery.

Notes

References

Further reading
 

Manila Light Rail Transit System
Rolling stock of the Philippines
Train-related introductions in 2022
750 V DC multiple units
CAF multiple units